In telecommunication, the term camp-on busy signal has the following meanings: 

A signal that informs a busy telephone user that another call originator is waiting for a connection. Synonym: call waiting
A teleprinter exchange facility signal that automatically causes a calling station to retry the call-receiver number after a given interval when the call-receiver teleprinter is occupied or the circuits are busy. Synonym: speed-up tone

Telephony signals
Telegrams